Charles N. Barnes (March 25, 1860–February 4, 1932) was an American politician and politician.

Barnes was born in Marshall County, Illinois. He went to Washburn High School. Barnes went to University of Iowa and University of Chicago Law School. Barnes was admitted to the Illinois bar in 1884. He served as manager of the Springer Land Irrigation Company in New Mexico for a brief time. Barnes lived in Lacon, Illinois. He served as the state's attorney for Marshall County. He also served on the Marshall County Board and was a Democrat. Marshall served in the Illinois Senate for 1893 to 1897. Barnes died at his home in Peoria, Illinois.

Notes

External links

1860 births
1932 deaths
People from Lacon, Illinois
University of Iowa alumni
University of Chicago Law School alumni
District attorneys in Illinois
Illinois lawyers
County board members in Illinois
Illinois state senators